Ceyreste is a commune located about 23 km (14.3 mi) east of Marseille in the department of Bouches-du-Rhône in the Provence-Alpes-Côte d'Azur region in southern France.

Population
Its inhabitants are called Ceyrestens in French.

See also
Communes of the Bouches-du-Rhône department
Antoine Sartorio

References

External links
 Official town website

Communes of Bouches-du-Rhône
Bouches-du-Rhône communes articles needing translation from French Wikipedia